Sengierite is a rare oxide and hydroxide mineral, chemically a copper and uranyl vanadate, belonging to the carnotite group. Its chemical formula is Cu2(OH)2[UO2VO4]2·6H2O.

References

Bibliography
 Palache, P.; Berman H.; Frondel, C. (1960). "Dana's System of Mineralogy, Volume II: Halides, Nitrates, Borates, Carbonates, Sulfates, Phosphates, Arsenates, Tungstates, Molybdates, Etc. (Seventh Edition)" John Wiley and Sons, Inc., New York, pp. 1047-1048.

copper(II) minerals
phosphate minerals
uranium(VI) minerals